Wetumpka High School is a public high school in Wetumpka, Alabama, United States. It is one of four high schools in the Elmore County Public School System.

History
Wetumpka High School was founded in 1897 as the 5th District Agricultural School. It became known as Wetumpka High School in 1932.

Athletics 
The following sports are offered at Wetumpka:

 Band
 Baseball
 Basketball
 Cheerleading
 Cross country
 Fishing
 Flag Running
 Football
 Golf
 Soccer
 Softball
 Tennis
 Track and field
 Volleyball
 Wrestling

Notable alumni
 Luke Sewell, former Major League Baseball player, coach, and manager
 Jamie Winborn, former National Football League linebacker

References

External links
 

Schools in Elmore County, Alabama
Public high schools in Alabama
Educational institutions established in 1897
1897 establishments in Alabama